Dobrush District, Dobrušski Rajon is a district of Gomel Region, in Belarus. Its capital is Dobrush and the uninhabited Russian exclave Sankovo-Medvezhye is situated here.

Administrative Divisions
The Dobrush District is divided into 14 village council regions (Selsovets).

  Borschovsky
 Ivakovsky
 Kormyansky
 Krugovets-Kalininsky
 Krupetsky
 Kuzminichsky
 Leninist
 Nosovichsky
 Pererostovsky
 Rassvetovsky
 Terekhovsky
 Usoho-Budsky
 Utevsky
 Zhgunsky

Notable residents 
 Cimoch Vostrykaǔ (in Belarusian Цімох Вострыкаў) (1922, Barščoŭka village - 2007), member of the anti-Soviet resistance, representative of the Rada of the Belarusian Democratic Republic, a Gulag prisoner

References

External links 

 Official site of regional executive committee

Districts of Gomel Region